Geoffrey Patterson (born 1954) is an American sound engineer. He has been nominated for two Academy Awards in the category Best Sound Mixing. He has worked on more than 100 films since 1985.

Selected filmography
 Leprechaun (1993)
 Twister (1996)
 Transformers: Revenge of the Fallen (2009)

References

External links

1954 births
Living people
American audio engineers
People from Detroit